B.F. Larsen (May 10, 1882 - 1970) was an American art educator and painter. He taught Art at Brigham Young University for five decades, and he was the chair of its Department of Art. He painted French and Utahn landscapes.

Early life
Larsen was born in 1882 in Monroe, Utah. He graduated from Snow College, followed by Brigham Young University in 1908.

Teaching career and French influence
Larsen began his career as an educator. Before attending BYU, he had taught in Cove and Green River, and in his hometown of Monroe. In his last year at BYU, he taught at the Springville High School in Springville.

Larsen began his five-decade teaching career at Brigham Young University in 1908, and he was eventually promoted to full professor and chair the Department of Art. He took a hiatus in the 1920s to study at the Art Institute of Chicago in 1922, and to live in France in the 1924–1925, where he studied at the Académie Julian, the Académie Colarossi, and the Académie de la Grande Chaumière. He was also trained by Cubist painter André Lhote.

Shortly after his return to Utah, Larsen completed his first painting in 1927. For the next four decades, he painted French and Utahn landscapes. Larsen became a member of the American Water Color Society. According to Utah Art, Utah Artists, "His colors, especially yellow, bright but subtle, were applied with vitality." For the Utah Artists Project, Larsen "made a varied contribution to Utah's artistic tradition."

Larsen retired as professor emeritus at BYU in 1953.

Personal life and death
Larsen was a member of the Church of Jesus Christ of Latter-day Saints, and he married Geneva Day in the Manti Utah Temple.

Larsen died in 1970 in Provo, Utah, at age 87. His papers are held at BYU's Harold B. Lee Library.

References

1882 births
1970 deaths
People from Monroe, Utah
Snow College alumni
Brigham Young University alumni
University of Utah alumni
Académie Julian alumni
Académie Colarossi alumni
Alumni of the Académie de la Grande Chaumière
American expatriates in France
American landscape painters
American male painters
American watercolorists
Painters from Utah
20th-century American painters